The 2008 Colorado Buffaloes football team represented the University of Colorado at Boulder in the 2008 NCAA Division I FBS football season.  The team was coached by Dan Hawkins and played their home games in Folsom Field.

Pre-season
Riar Geer was suspended "from everything football-related" after being arrested on suspicion of second-degree assault and harassment on March 15, 2008. This was less than 24 hours after Lynn Katoa was arrested March 14, 2008 on suspicion for assault at a party on February 16, 2008. This now makes four football players that have had charges brought against them this year. On January 19, 2008, Kai Maiava was ticketed with underage possession and consumption of alcohol and Nate Vaiomounga was charged the same night for criminal mischief under $500. Vaiomounga was also charged February 16, 2008 with underage possession and consumption of alcohol for a separate incident. On April 13, 2008, Jake Duren was arrested for first-degree criminal trespass and kicked off the team 4 hours later. Durin was found bloody and passed out after police followed a blood trail from a broken car window to him in the Smiley Court family residence hall where he did not live.

Spring practice
The Spring game was April 19, 2008. On the day before, Colorado was one of twenty schools competing in a Gridiron Bash where the Counting Crows will perform. The event was canceled weeks before hand due to NCAA rules on student athlete benefits. Former Colorado head coach Bill McCartney issued a challenge to Buffalo fans and students to fill Folsom Field for the spring game during a luncheon about CU football recruiting. Filling the stadium would make a statement of support from the community that should help with recruiting. Filling the stadium with 50,000 or more fans would be a huge contrast to past season that have estimated the attendance at the spring game at 6,000 or less. Actual attendance was 17,800, a record for spring game.

Awards
George Hypolite
Lombardi Award watchlist
Lott Trophy watchlist
Outland Trophy watchlist

Recruiting
National Signing Day was on February 6, 2008 and Colorado signed high school athletes from around the country. 

Key recruit was five-star running back Darrell Scott of Ventura, California. Scott is the highest rated recruit heading to Colorado since Marcus Houston of Denver came to Boulder as part of the 2000 class.

Official 2008 CU Signing Day Central

Schedule

Roster
Kai Maiava, who was a freshman All-Big 12 offensive linemen in 2007, and switched to the fullback position in the offseason, decided to leave the team after the 2008 spring semester. His reasons did not include the position switch, but for family issues. He transferred to UCLA.

Coaching staff

Game summaries

Colorado State

The 2008 Qwest Rocky Mountain Showdown was played at Invesco Field at Mile High in Denver.

External link: https://web.archive.org/web/20070827084821/http://www.qwestrockymountainshowdown.com/

Eastern Washington

West Virginia

Florida State

Texas

The morning of the game, sports books favored Texas by 13 points.

The Longhorns won 38–14.

Kansas

Heading into the game against Colorado, Kansas was ranked #15 in the Coaches Poll. This made the 17th consecutive week that Kansas was ranked in the Top 25 (dating back to 2007), a school record. Before the start of the game Kansas Coach Mark Mangino asked the KU student section to refrain from an expletive kickoff chant that has become a student tradition. Despite Mangino's plea, the student section yelled the chant louder than ever. Colorado scored first with an 11-yard Cody Hawkins touchdown pass. Colorado got the ball back soon thereafter, but Hawkins threw an interception inside the red zone and the Kansas defense prevented another Colorado score. Kansas first got on the board with a Jake Sharp touchdown run in the 2nd Quarter. On Colorado's next possession, Hawkins was sacked for a 17-yard loss and a safety to give Kansas its first lead. Once again Kansas came out and played much better in the second half. In the second half Todd Reesing passed for his only touchdown to Dezmond Briscoe and Sharp rushed for two more touchdowns. Sharp's first start of the season was successful as he rushed for 118 yards on 31 carries and for 3 touchdowns. Sharp's performance was by far the best of any Kansas running back through the first 6 games of the season. Reesing had his most accurate game of the season, completing 27 of 34 passes for 256 yards and 1 touchdown. Wide receiver Kerry Meier had 9 receptions for 94 yards. A few hours after the Kansas win, the only other undefeated North team in Big 12 play, Missouri, lost to Oklahoma State. Kansas stood atop the Big 12 North with a record of 2–0.

Kansas State

Going into the game, K-State had beaten Colorado two years in a row, including a win in Boulder in 2006.  Colorado was favored by 3½.  Colorado leads the all-time series 43-19-1.

The Colorado Buffaloes found an answer to their quarterback troubles, turning to freshman Tyler Hansen, who sparked them to a 14-13 win.

Cody Hawkins, the son of Buffs coach Dan Hawkins, was benched and switched offensive series with Tyler Hansen.

Although Hawkins mostly handed off to Rodney Stewart (29 carries for 141 yards), he also hit J.R. Smith for 22 yards on third-and-15 from his own 29 on the drive.

His fourth-and-4 pass to Smith, however, fell incomplete and Kansas State took over at its own 31 with 59 seconds remaining.

Josh Freeman's fourth-down desperation heave to Brandon Banks at the Buffs’ 20-yard line was broken up by free safety Ryan Walters on the last play of the game.

Hansen finished a modest 7-of-14 for 71 yards with one touchdown and one interception, but he also ran 19 times for 86 yards, bringing a dimension that Hawkins doesn’t have. Hawkins was 6-of-11 for 35 yards.

Trailing 6-0 and in need of a spark to break out of their monthlong slump, Hansen entered the game and promptly fumbled his first snap out of bounds. But on third-and-12 from his 28, Hansen gained 13 yards on a draw play and suddenly the Buffs, who snapped a three-game skid, had the momentum.

He drove them to the Kansas State 4, where Hawkins re-entered and handed off to Stewart, who ran into the end zone to give Colorado a 7-6 lead.

The next time Hansen drove the Buffs downfield, Hawkins stayed on the sideline and Hansen hit Scotty McKnight with a 21-yard touchdown pass down the left sideline for a 14-6 lead.

Brooks Rossman kicked field goals of 37 and 53 yards but was wide right from 47 yards and wide left from 42 in the first half.

The Wildcats pulled to 14-13 when Freeman scored untouched on 17-yard keeper early in the third quarter.

Colorado had a chance to pad its slim lead but Aric Goodman's 47-yard field goal try sailed wide right at the last moment. Goodman's 48-yard attempt in the first half was blocked by Ian Campbell, Kansas State's seventh block in seven games, best in the nation.

Missouri

The Tigers won their 600th game since their inception in 1890, in an overwhelming 58-0 shutout of the Buffaloes in the Tigers' Homecoming game at Faurot Field rolling up 491 total offensive yards. Chase Daniel passed for 302 yards, and the runners ran for another 189 yards.  Daniel was 31-for-37 throwing five touchdowns, intercepted once. Jeremy Maclin had 11 pass receptions for 134 yards with two touchdowns. The defense was outstanding, holding Colorado to a mere 41 net yards rushing and 158 passing for only 199 total offensive yards.

Texas A&M

Coming into the game, the Aggies had held a 2–5 overall record against the Colorado Buffaloes. Of the three games that were played at Kyle Field, the Aggies had only won the 2004 contest. In the preseason, the Buffaloes acquired Darrell Scott, who was ranked the best running back in the 2008 recruiting class by Rivals.com. In their previous game, the Buffaloes suffered a 58–0 shutout at the hands of No. 16 Missouri. Both teams bought an even matchup to the field, with Colorado fielding an offense that had scored 19 points per game, whereas A&M's scoring defense had allowed 35 points per game. The Aggie defense had given up a total of 1,584 in their past three games against Iowa State, Texas Tech, and Kansas State. A&M was favored to win by 3.5 points.

Iowa State

Highlights: Colorado trailed 24-13 with 10 minutes left in the game. The final play the Colorado defense stopped Iowa State running back Alexander Robinson with a 2-yard loss on CU's 1-yard line. Cody Hawkins replaced QB Tyler Hansen in the second half. Hawkins threw for 226 yards. Kicker Aric Goodman missed two field goals and had a blocked kick.

Oklahoma State

Nebraska

Statistics

Team

Scores by quarter

Offense

Rushing

Passing

Receiving

Defense

Special teams

References

Colorado
Colorado Buffaloes football seasons
Colorado Buffaloes football